Lee v Showmen's Guild of Great Britain [1952] 2 QB 329 is a UK labour law case, concerning the construction of terms in a contract of employment.

Facts

Frank Lee was expelled from the Showmen's Guild after refusing to respect the outcome of a dispute over place at a fairground. He had been given a spot, for his roundabout show called Noah's Ark, by a local corporation, but the guild decided it should be reallocated to another member, Shaw, who had the site before the war. In 1948, they both arrived at the same spot, and got into an argument. When the dispute was heard, the guild imposed a fine on Lee. He refused to pay, and was expelled from the guild. He alleged that this prevented him from earning a living and so sought an injunction.

Ormerod J granted an injunction against the expulsion, holding that there was no breach of the relevant rule, because no conduct had amounted to unfair competition. The committee's decision was wrong in law, ultra vires and void.

Judgment
The Court of Appeal held that Frank Lee should not have been expelled, because the committee had acted outside the rules of the union. Somervell LJ gave a judgment upholding the injunction.

Denning LJ gave the following concurring judgment.

See also

UK labour law

Notes

References

United Kingdom labour case law
United Kingdom trade union case law
Court of Appeal (England and Wales) cases
1952 in British law
1952 in case law